Calliphaula is a genus of beetles in the family Cerambycidae, containing the following species:

 Calliphaula filiola Martins, 1984
 Calliphaula leucippe (Bates, 1881)

References

Aerenicini